Tai Po Sam Yuk Secondary School ("TPSY" ) is a co-educational Christian secondary school, located in Tai Po, New Territories, Hong Kong. The school is owned and operated by the Seventh-day Adventist Church.

It is a part of the Seventh-day Adventist education system, the world's second largest Christian school system.

History 
The school was established and began teaching in 1956. In January 1960, the President of the South China Union Mission, EL Longway, reported that funds had been collected and were available for a new school to be built at Tai Po, at a projected cost of about HK$200,000. This was the first middle school ever to be established by any organization in the old market town of Tai Po. Tai Po was one of the first places where church evangelism was conducted in the early days, shortly after the pioneers established the Adventist church in Hong Kong. When the construction of the school began, the Tai Po church had grown to about 70 members.

Facilities 
All classrooms are air-conditioned with Internet access and digital projectors. There is a 300-square-metre library, a Physical Fitness Centre, a hall, a science (MML) Laboratory, a design (MML) Room, a campus TV station, four science laboratories, two computer rooms, a geography room, a music room, a home economics room, an art room, a Multi-Media Learning Centre, a Youth Centre and an elevator.

See also

 List of Seventh-day Adventist secondary and elementary schools
 Seventh-day Adventist education
 Seventh-day Adventist Church
 Seventh-day Adventist theology
 History of the Seventh-day Adventist Church
 List of secondary schools in Hong Kong

References

External links 

 Official website

Private schools in Hong Kong
Adventist secondary schools in China
Secondary schools in Hong Kong
Sixth form colleges in Hong Kong
Direct Subsidy Scheme schools
Tai Po District